This article is about the demographic features of the population of Madagascar, including population density, ethnicity, education level, health of the populace, economic status, religious affiliations and other aspects of the population.

Madagascar's population is predominantly of mixed Austronesian and East African origin.

Population

 
The problem with population estimation in Madagascar is that data is very old and limited.  The last population census was carried out in 1993, after an initial 1975 census.  There was an attempt at a census in 2009, but this attempt ultimately failed due to political instability.  Therefore, the demographic situation is inferred but reliability of any estimates from any source has a large margin of error.
The proportion of children below the age of 15 in 2010 was 43.1%, 53.8% was between 15 and 65 years of age, while 3.1% was 65 years or older.

Population Estimates by Sex and Age Group (01.VII.2019):

UN population projections
UN medium variant projections:

Vital statistics
Registration of vital events in Madagascar is not complete. The Population Department of the United Nations prepared the following estimates.

Source: UN DESA, World Population Prospects, 2022

Fertility and births
 
Total Fertility Rate (TFR) and Crude Birth Rate (CBR):

Fertility data as of 2008-2009 (DHS Program):

Life expectancy

Source: UN World Population Prospects

Ethnicity

The island of Madagascar is predominantly populated by people broadly classified as belonging to the  Malagasy ethno-linguistic group. This group is further subdivided a number of ethnic groups, often into the standard eighteen.
In addition, communities of Indians in Madagascar and Arabs and Somalis have long been established on the island and have assimilated into local communities to varying degrees, in some places having long since become identified "Malagasy" ethnic groups, and in others maintaining distinct identities and cultural separation. More recent arrivals include Europeans and Chinese immigrants.

Madagascar was probably uninhabited prior to Austronesian settlement in the early centuries AD. Austronesian features are most predominant in the central highlands peoples and coastal peoples are phenotypically East African with various Malay, Arab, Somali, European and Indian admixtures. The largest coastal groups are the Betsimisaraka (1,500,000) and the Tsimihety and Sakalava (700,000 each). Malagasy society has long been polarized between the politically and economically advantaged highlanders of the central plateaux and the people along the coast. For example, in the 1970s there was widespread opposition among coastal ethnics against the policy of "Malagasization" which intended to phase out the use of the French language in public life in favour of a more prominent position for the Malagasy language, whose orthography is based on the Merina dialect. Identity politics were also at the core of the brief civil unrest during 2002.

Indians in Madagascar descend mostly from traders who arrived in the newly independent nation looking for better opportunities. The majority of them came from the west coast of India known as Karana (Muslim) and Banian (Hindu). The majority speak Hindi or Gujarati, although some other Indian dialects are also spoken.  the younger generations speak at least three languages, including French, Gujarati and Malagasy. A large number of the Indians in Madagascar have a high level of education, particularly the younger generation.

A sizeable number of Europeans also reside in Madagascar, mostly of French descent.

Religion

According to the 1993 national census, 41% of Madagascans practise Christianity and 52% practise traditional religion, which tends to emphasize links between the living and the razana (ancestors). But according to the Pew Research Center in 2020, only 4.5% of Madagascans practise folk religions and 85% are Christian. According to the Association of Religion Data Archives, 58.1% of the population is Christian, 2.1% is Muslim, 39.2% practices traditional faiths, while 0.6% of the population is non-religious or adheres to other faiths as of 2020.

Madagascar's traditional religions tend to emphasize links between the living and the dead. They believe that the dead join their ancestors in the ranks of divinity and that ancestors are intensely concerned with the fate of their living descendants. This spiritual communion is celebrated by the Merina and Betsileo reburial practice of famadihana, or "turning over the dead". In this ritual, relatives' remains are removed from the family tomb, rewrapped in new silk shrouds, and returned to the tomb following festive ceremonies in their honor. In the festivities, they eat, drink, and literally dance with the dead. After one or two days of celebrating, they shower the body with gifts and rebury it.
   
Malagasy Christians are mostly Protestant (mainly Reformed Protestant Church of Jesus Christ in Madagascar (FJKM), Lutheran, and Anglican) or Roman Catholic, but there are also smaller groups such as members of the Church of Jesus Christ of Latter-day Saints (Mormons), Jehovah's Witnesses, Seventh-day Adventists, and Eastern Orthodox Christians. Many incorporate the cult of the dead with their other religious beliefs and bless their dead at church before proceeding with the traditional burial rites. They also may invite a pastor to attend a famadihana. A historical rivalry exists between the predominantly Catholic masses, considered to be underprivileged, and the predominantly Protestant Merina aristocrats, who tend to prevail in the civil service, business, and professions.
   
Followers of Islam constitute approximately 7% of the population, according to the US Department of State in 2011, (down from their earlier estimate of 10 to 15% in 2009), or 3% according to the Pew Research Center in 2010. They are mostly concentrated in the north, northwest, and southeast. There are also a small number of Hindus.
   
The Church of Jesus Christ of Latter-day Saints has more than 13,000 members in 42 congregations in Madagascar.

A small community started practicing Judaism in 2012, and formally converted in 2016 with the assistance of Kulanu, a nonprofit organization focusing on remote Jewish communities.

Other demographic statistics 
Demographic statistics according to the World Population Review in 2022.

One birth every 35 seconds	
One death every 3 minutes	
One net migrant every 360 minutes	
Net gain of one person every 42 seconds

The following demographic are from the CIA World Factbook unless otherwise indicated.

Population
28,172,462 (2022 est.)
25,683,610 (July 2018 est.)

Age structure

0-14 years: 38.86% (male 5,278,838/female 5,196,036)
15-24 years: 20.06% (male 2,717,399/female 2,689,874)
25-54 years: 33.02% (male 4,443,147/female 4,456,691
55-64 years: 4.6% (male 611,364/female 627,315)
65 years and over: 3.47% (male 425,122/female 509,951)  (2020 est.)

0-14 years: 39.55% (male 5,119,804 /female 5,037,438)
15-24 years: 20.23% (male 2,608,996 /female 2,587,745)
25-54 years: 32.42% (male 4,160,278 /female 4,166,538)
55-64 years: 4.45% (male 560,072 /female 581,963)
65 years and over: 3.35% (male 390,094 /female 470,682) (2018 est.)

Median age
total: 20.3 years. Country comparison to the world: 193rd
male: 20.1 years
female: 20.5 years (2020 est.)

total: 19.9 years. Country comparison to the world: 195th
male: 19.7 years 
female: 20.1 years (2018 est.)

Birth rate
28.68 births/1,000 population (2022 est.) Country comparison to the world: 33rd
31 births/1,000 population (2018 est.) Country comparison to the world: 33rd

Death rate
6 deaths/1,000 population (2022 est.) Country comparison to the world: 159th
6.4 deaths/1,000 population (2018 est.) Country comparison to the world: 147th

Total fertility rate
3.62 children born/woman (2022 est.) Country comparison to the world: 34
3.95 children born/woman (2018 est.) Country comparison to the world: 35th

Population growth rate
2.27% (2022 est.) Country comparison to the world: 34th
2.46% (2018 est.) Country comparison to the world: 24th

Mother's mean age at first birth
19.5 years (2008/09 est.)
note: median age at first birth among women 25-29

Contraceptive prevalence rate
44.4% (2018)
39.8% (2012/13)

Net migration rate
0 migrant(s)/1,000 population (2022 est.) Country comparison to the world: 90th

Dependency ratios
total dependency ratio: 80.1 (2015 est.)
youth dependency ratio: 75 (2015 est.)
elderly dependency ratio: 5.1 (2015 est.)
potential support ratio: 19.6 (2015 est.)

Urbanization

urban population: 39.9% of total population (2022)
rate of urbanization: 4.26% annual rate of change (2020-25 est.)

urban population: 37.2% of total population (2018)
rate of urbanization: 4.48% annual rate of change (2015-20 est.)

The largest city in Madagascar is Antananarivo. The next largest cities are Toamasina, Antsirabe, Fianarantsoa, Mahajanga, Toliara, Antsiranana and Ambovombe.

Life expectancy at birth
total population: 68.17 years. Country comparison to the world: 184th
male: 66.8 years
female: 69.57 years (2022 est.)

total population: 66.6 years (2018 est.)
male: 65.1 years (2018 est.)
female: 68.2 years (2018 est.)

total population:: 66.3 years (2017 est.)
male: 64.7 years
female: 67.8 years

Major infectious diseases
degree of risk: very high (2020)
food or waterborne diseases: bacterial diarrhea, hepatitis A, and typhoid fever
vectorborne diseases: malaria and dengue fever
water contact diseases: schistosomiasis
animal contact diseases: rabies

note: on 21 March 2022, the US Centers for Disease Control and Prevention (CDC) issued a Travel Alert for polio in Africa; Madagascar is currently considered a high risk to travelers for circulating vaccine-derived polioviruses (cVDPV); vaccine-derived poliovirus (VDPV) is a strain of the weakened poliovirus that was initially included in oral polio vaccine (OPV) and that has changed over time and behaves more like the wild or naturally occurring virus; this means it can be spread more easily to people who are unvaccinated against polio and who come in contact with the stool or respiratory secretions, such as from a sneeze, of an “infected” person who received oral polio vaccine; the CDC recommends that before any international travel, anyone unvaccinated, incompletely vaccinated, or with an unknown polio vaccination status should complete the routine polio vaccine series; before travel to any high-risk destination, CDC recommends that adults who previously completed the full, routine polio vaccine series receive a single, lifetime booster dose of polio vaccine

Religions 
Protestant (45.8%)

Roman Catholic (38.1%)

Other Christian (1.1%)

Muslim (3%)

Folk religions (4.5%)

Unaffiliated (6.9%)

Sex ratio
at birth:
1.03 male(s)/female
under 15 years:
1.01 male(s)/female
15–64 years:
0.98 male(s)/female
65 years and over:
0.89 male(s)/female
total population:
0.99 male(s)/female (2000 est.)

Nationality
noun:
Malagasy (singular and plural)
adjective:
Malagasy

Ethnic groups
Malayo-Indonesian (Merina and related Betsileo), coastal ethnics (mixed African, Malayo-Indonesian, and Arab ancestry – Betsimisaraka, Tsimihety, Antaisaka, Sakalava), French, Indian, Creole, Comorian, Chinese

Languages
Malagasy (official, and national language), French (official).

Education expenditures
2.9% of GDP (2019) Country comparison to the world: 158th

Literacy
definition: age 15 and over can read and write (2018 est.)
total population: 76.7% (2018 est.)
male: 78.4% (2018 est.)
female: 75.1% (2018 est.)

School life expectancy (primary to tertiary education)
total: 10 years
male: 10 years
female: 10 years (2018)

References

See also

 Matthew E. Hules, et al. (2005). The Dual Origin of the Malagasy in Island Southeast Asia and East Africa: Evidence from Maternal and Paternal Lineages. American Journal of Human Genetics, 76:894-901, 2005.

 
Society of Madagascar